The Roman Catholic Diocese of Kribi is a diocese located in the city of Kribi in the Ecclesiastical province of Yaoundé in Cameroon.

History
 May 20, 1991: Established as Diocese of Ebolowa–Kribi from the Diocese of Sangmélima. 
June 19, 2008: Diocese split to form the Diocese of Ebolowa and the Diocese of Kribi.

Leadership
 Bishops of Kribi (Roman rite)
 Bishop Joseph Befe Ateba (June 19, 2008  – June 4, 2014)
 Bishop Damase Zinga Atangana (November 7, 2015 -)

See also
Roman Catholicism in Cameroon

References

External links
 GCatholic.org

Roman Catholic dioceses in Cameroon
Roman Catholic dioceses established in 1991
1991 establishments in Cameroon
Roman Catholic Ecclesiastical Province of Yaoundé
Roman Catholic bishops of Kribi